Sweetheart is a term of endearment often applied to a loved one, or a person who demonstrates a significant amount of kindness.

Sweetheart may also refer to:

Places
Sweetheart Abbey in Scotland
Sweetheart City, Wisconsin, United States

Arts, entertainment, and media

Films
Sweetheart, also known as Toutes peines confondues, a 1992 film
Sweetheart (2015 film), a Bangladeshi romantic drama film
Sweetheart (2019 film), an American survival horror film
Sweetheart (2019 French film)

Music
Sweetheart, a Finnish noise rock band of the 1990s founded by Janne Westerlund
"Sweetheart" (Bee Gees song), covered by Engelbert Humperdinck
"Sweetheart" (Rainy Davis song), covered by Mariah Carey and Jermaine Dupri
"Sweetheart" (Franke and the Knockouts song)
Sweet heart, a 2009 EP and single by the Klaxons

Brands and enterprises
Sweethearts (candy), a popular Valentine's Day heart shaped candy
Sweetheart Cup Company

Fauna and flora
Sweetheart (crocodile) (died 1979), famous Australian crocodile
Talinum fruticosum, an herbaceous perennial plant

Other uses
Sweetheart deal or sweetheart contract
Sweetheart neckline
Childhood sweetheart

See also
Sweethearts (disambiguation)